Jason Seacole (born 10 April 1960) is an English former footballer who played for Oxford United and Wycombe Wanderers. During his spell at Oxford, he became the youngest player to play for the club since it joined the Football League, making his debut as a substitute in a Third Division fixture against Mansfield Town on 7 September 1976 aged just 16 years and 149 days. He is also the club's youngest scorer in the league.

References

External links
Rage Online profile

1960 births
English footballers
Association football midfielders
Wycombe Wanderers F.C. players
Oxford United F.C. players
English Football League players
Living people